The Harbour Grace CeeBee Stars, (also commonly known as the Harbour Grace Ocean Enterprises CeeBee Stars due to a sponsorship deal that began October 23, 2015) are a senior ice hockey team based in Harbour Grace, Newfoundland and Labrador and part of the Avalon East Senior Hockey League.  The CeeBees are eight-time winners of the Herder Memorial Trophy as provincial champions.

History
The club has its roots in the former Conception Bay Ceebees, a very successful hockey club in the Newfoundland Senior Hockey League from 1958 to 1969. The CeeBee Stars were founded in 2003 and joined the Avalon East Senior Hockey League. The Stars won six straight AESHL championships from 2006 to 2011 and are four-time winners of the Herder Memorial Trophy, emblematic of Newfoundland senior hockey supremacy.

From 2011 to 2014, the CeeBee Stars were part of the re-formed Newfoundland Senior Hockey League. In 2013, the CeeBee Stars defeated the defending Herder Trophy champion and 2011 Allan Cup champion Clarenville Caribous in four-straight-games.  The victory gave the CeeBee Stars the right to play in the 2014 Allan Cup in Dundas, Ontario.

The CeeBee Stars rejoined the Avalon East Senior Hockey League for the 2015–16 season. In September 2015, AESHL was granted senior A status by Hockey Newfoundland and Labrador. The AESHL champions will play the CWSHL champions for the Herder Memorial Trophy beginning in March 2016.

Seasons and records

Season by season results

Note: GP = Games played, W = Wins, L = Losses, T = Ties, OTL = Overtime Losses, Pts = Points, GF = Goals for, GA = Goals against, DNQ = Did not qualify

AESHL = Avalon East Senior Hockey League, NSHL = Newfoundland Senior Hockey League

Leaders

Captains
Chris Bartlett (2006–08)
Keith Delaney (2008–09, 2012–13)
Matthew Thomey (2009–12, 2019)
Mike Dyke (2012–13)
Robert Slaney
Sam Roberts (2016–17)

Coaches
Edmund (Eddie) Oates (2004–09)
Ian Moores (2010–11, 2013, 2019)
Steve Power (2011)
Corey Crocker (2011–13)

Championships and awards

Eight all-Newfoundland senior hockey championships (Herder Memorial Trophy): 1960, 1961, 1965, 1967, 2006, 2007, 2008, 2013, 2017

Honoured Members
Adam Jones

References

External links 
 Official website for the Cee Bees

Ice hockey in Newfoundland and Labrador
Defunct Ice hockey teams in Newfoundland and Labrador
Senior ice hockey teams